The Kazan Governorate, or the Government of Kazan, was a governorate (a guberniya) of the Tsardom of Russia, the Russian Empire, and the Russian SFSR from 1708–1920, with its seat in the city of Kazan.

History

These were the areas historically governed by the Kazan Palace's Prikaz. As with the rest of the governorates, neither the borders nor internal subdivisions of Kazan Governorate were defined; instead, the territory was defined as a set of cities and the lands adjacent to those cities.

In 1717, Astrakhan Governorate was separated from Kazan Governorate; in 1719—Nizhny Novgorod; in 1744—Orenburg; in 1781—Vyatka, Simbirsk, and Ufa Governorates were separated. Under Catherine the Great (1781–1796) Kazan was the center of a namestnichestvo (viceroyalty), with Kazan, Penza, and Saratov Governorates as its integral parts. 

At first the governorate was divided into lots (doli), then into provinces (provintsii) in 1719, and into uyezds in 1775. Prior to 1796, there were Kazan, Kozmodemyansk, Laishev, Mamadysh, Sviyazhsk, Spassk, Tetyushi, Tsaryovokokshaysk, Tsivilsk, Cheboksary, Chistopol, and Yadrin uyezds.

In 1913, the area of the governorate comprised 55,900 square versts, its population was estimated at 2.85 million (38.9% Russians, 31.2% Tatars, 22.8% Chuvash, 5.1% Mari, 1.2% Mordva). There were 7,272 settlements, including 13 towns: Kazan, Arsk, Sviyazhsk, Kozmodemyansk, Laishev, Mamadysh, Spassk, Tetyushi, Tsaryovokokshaysk, Tsivilsk, Cheboksary, Chistopol, Yadrin; and two posads: Mariinsky Posad and Troitsky Posad. 

The governorate was finally abolished during the Bolshevik administrative reform (see Idel-Ural State). Thereupon its Eastern part was proclaimed the Tatar ASSR, while the Western part was eventually divided between Chuvashia and Mari El.

Main events in the governorate
1774 Pugachev rebellion
1861 Bezdna unrest
1880s Wäisi movement

Administrative division
Kazan Governorate consisted of the following uyezds (administrative centres in parentheses):
 Kazansky Uyezd (Kazan)
 Kozmodemyansky Uyezd (Kozmodemyansk)
 Laishevsky Uyezd (Laishevo)
 Mamadyshsky Uyezd (Mamadysh)
 Sviyazhsky Uyezd (Sviyazhsk)
 Spassky Uyezd (Spassk)
 Tetyushsky Uyezd (Tetyushi)
 Tsaryovokokshaysky Uyezd (Tsaryovokokshaysk)
 Tsivilsky Uyezd (Tsivilsk)
 Cheboksarsky Uyezd (Cheboksary)
 Chistopolsky Uyezd (Chistopol)
 Yadrinsky Uyezd (Yadrin)

References

External links
Results of 1897 all-imperial census for Kazan Governorate

Further reading
 

 
History of Tatarstan
Governorates of the Russian Empire
States and territories established in 1708
1920 disestablishments in Russia
1708 establishments in Russia